Elainie Lillios is a composer. Lillios studied composition with Larry Austin, Jonty Harrison, Jon Christopher Nelson, Joseph Klein, and others. She has been a professor at Bowling Green State University since 2000. She was awarded First Prize in the 36th International Competition of Electroacoustic Music and Sonic Art in Bourges in 2009. In 2012, she was awarded a commission from the Groupe de Recherches Musicales in Paris. Her works have been included in several festivals such as Electronic Music Midwest Vox Novus's Fifteen Minutes of Fame, and 60x60

Works 

 Oceanus IV (1986)
 Eclectronic (1988)
 Pieces of Partch (1988)
 Cactus, Rock, Beaters (1991)
 Textural Visions (1991), 10:00
 CELLAR (1994–95), 5:02
 of a Single Mind? (1995), 12:00
 Au deuxième étage (1996), 3:00
 Supplications (1996)
 Sounds from the second floor (1996–97), 7:00
 Arturo (1998), 13:35
 Threads (1998), 4:50
 Stumbling Dance (1998–99), 14:45
 Earth Ascending (2000), 15:20
 Dreams in the Desert (2001), 10:45
 Backroads (2002), 10:51
 Speaking… again (2003), 11:00
 Hastening Toward the Half Moon (2004), 9:23
 Three “B” Textures (2005), 4:27
 Listening Beyond… (2007), 8:20
 Veiled Resonance (2007), 14:10
 The Long Way Home (2008), 7:48
 Stargazing (2008), 1:00
 Toronto Island Contrasts (2008), 1:00
 A Little Austinato (2009)
 Nostalgic Visions (2009), 11:00
 Among Fireflies (2010), 10:17
 Deep Fire (2010), 1:00
 Fireflies (2010), 5:30
 November Twilight (2011), 11:00
 Dry Wind (2012), 3:00
 Entracte (2012), 1:00
 La fête de la huitième décennie (2012), 2:10
 Last Night I Dreamed That My Whole House Was Clean (2012), 1:00
 The Rush of the Brook Stills the Mind (2013), 15:00
 On the essence of memory (2014)
 Contemplating Larry (2015), 12:12
 After Long Drought (2016), 11:30
 Sleep’s Undulating Tide (2016), 13:00
 Hazy Moonlight (2017)
 Undertow (2018)
 Immeasurable Distance (2019)

References

External links
http://elillios.com/ Personal website

Articles and reviews
Karen E. Moorman, "Arts Now Series: 60 x 60", September 18, 2012, Raleigh, North Carolina
Madeline Carey, "Concert of New Music at CAC Friday", The Daily Athenaeum, February 15, 2012
Tom Strini, "Unruly Music gets off to orderly start in its 2006-07 season", Milwaukee Journal Sentinel September 13, 2006
Toledo Blade -  2003

20th-century classical composers
21st-century American composers
21st-century classical composers
American women classical composers
American classical composers
Living people
American women in electronic music
Year of birth missing (living people)
20th-century American women musicians
20th-century American composers
21st-century American women musicians
20th-century women composers
21st-century women composers